"The Drum" is a song recorded by Bobby Sherman from his Portrait Of Bobby LP.  It was released as a single in the spring of 1971, the second of two from the album.   The song was written by Alan O'Day, his first of five Top 40 chart credits.

The song was Sherman's final top 40 hit in the U.S., peaking at No. 29 Billboard  and No. 22 Cash Box, while reaching No. 2 on Billboards Easy Listening chart.

In Canada, the song reached No. 7 on the "RPM 100" Top Singles chart and No. 3 Adult Contemporary.

Chart performance

References

External links
 Lyrics of this song
 

Songs about drums
1971 songs
1971 singles
Bobby Sherman songs
Songs written by Alan O'Day